Kupech is a Ukrainian village in the Korosten Raion (district) of Zhytomyr Oblast (province). It is located between the villages of Khodaky to the east and Bekhy to the west.

References

Korosten Raion

Villages in Korosten Raion